South San Gabriel is a census-designated place (CDP) in Los Angeles County, California, United States.  The population was 8,070 at the 2010 census, up from 7,595 at the 2000 census.

Geography
South San Gabriel is located at  (34.049060, -118.095150).

According to the United States Census Bureau, the CDP has a total area of 0.8 square miles (2.2 km), over 99% of it land.

Demographics

2010
At the 2010 census South San Gabriel had a population of 8,070. The racial makeup of South San Gabriel was 2,198 (27.2%) White (5.6% Non-Hispanic White), 83 (1.0%) African American, 56 (0.7%) Native American, 3,990 (49.4%) Asian, 4 (0.0%) Pacific Islander, 1,427 (17.7%) from other races, and 312 (3.9%) from two or more races. Hispanic or Latino of any race were 3,444 persons (42.7%).

The census reported that 7,834 people (97.1% of the population) lived in households, 7 (0.1%) lived in non-institutionalized group quarters, and 229 (2.8%) were institutionalized.

There were 2,249 households, 874 (38.9%) had children under the age of 18 living in them, 1,249 (55.5%) were opposite-sex married couples living together, 393 (17.5%) had a female householder with no husband present, 211 (9.4%) had a male householder with no wife present.  There were 96 (4.3%) unmarried opposite-sex partnerships, and 15 (0.7%) same-sex married couples or partnerships. 308 households (13.7%) were one person and 150 (6.7%) had someone living alone who was 65 or older. The average household size was 3.48.  There were 1,853 families (82.4% of households); the average family size was 3.76.

The age distribution was 1,648 people (20.4%) under the age of 18, 737 people (9.1%) aged 18 to 24, 2,108 people (26.1%) aged 25 to 44, 2,225 people (27.6%) aged 45 to 64, and 1,352 people (16.8%) who were 65 or older.  The median age was 40.5 years. For every 100 females, there were 92.9 males.  For every 100 females age 18 and over, there were 90.0 males.

There were 2,353 housing units at an average density of 2,823.8 per square mile, of the occupied units 1,597 (71.0%) were owner-occupied and 652 (29.0%) were rented. The homeowner vacancy rate was 1.1%; the rental vacancy rate was 4.8%.  5,545 people (68.7% of the population) lived in owner-occupied housing units and 2,289 people (28.4%) lived in rental housing units.

2000

At the 2000 census there were 7,595 people, 2,091 households, and 1,727 families in the CDP. The population density was 9,106.3 inhabitants per square mile (3,533.1/km). The racial makeup of the CDP was 0.39% African American, 1.17% Native American, 33.34% Asian, 0.20% Pacific Islander, 19.93% from other races, and 4.24% from two or more races. Hispanic or Latino 64.96% of the population, and 11.72% White.
Of the 2,091 households 37.6% had children under the age of 18 living with them, 57.6% were married couples living together, 17.7% had a female householder with no husband present, and 17.4% were non-families. 13.7% of households were one person and 6.5% were one person aged 65 or older.  The average household size was 3.52 and the average family size was 3.85.

The age distribution was 25.0% under the age of 18, 9.0% from 18 to 24, 29.0% from 25 to 44, 22.9% from 45 to 64, and 14.1% 65 or older.  The median age was 36 years. For every 100 females, there were 95.5 males.  For every 100 females age 18 and over, there were 93.5 males.

The median household income was $51,136 and the median family income  was $50,451. Males had a median income of $35,598 versus $30,091 for females. The per capita income for the CDP was $16,345.  About 8.2% of families and 11.0% of the population were below the poverty line, including 11.6% of those under age 18 and 14.4% of those age 65 or over.

Education
The community is served by the Montebello Unified School District, and the Garvey School District.

Schools include:
 Potrero Heights Elementary School (Los Angeles County)
 Macy Intermediate School (Monterey Park)
 Schurr High School (Montebello)

Politics

In the state legislature, South San Gabriel is located in California's 22nd State Senate district, represented by Democrat Susan Rubio, and in California's 49th State Assembly district, represented by Democrat Ed Chau. Federally, South San Gabriel is located in California's 27th congressional district, which is represented by Democrat Judy Chu.

The Los Angeles County Sheriff's Department (LASD) operates the Temple Station in Temple City, serving South San Gabriel.

See also

References

Communities in the San Gabriel Valley
Census-designated places in Los Angeles County, California
San Gabriel, California
Census-designated places in California